= Corridor D (Europe) =

Corridor D in Europe is a multinational, multiagency project to improve freight rail capacity and speed, initiated and supported by the European Commission.
